Symmerus is a genus of fungus gnats and gall midges in the family Ditomyiidae. There are about five described species in Symmerus.

Species
S. akikoae Saigusa, 1973
S. annulatus (Meigen, 1830) i c g
S. antennalis Okada, 1936
S. balticus Edwards, 1921
S. brevicornis Okada, 1939
S. coqula Garrett, 1925 i c g
S. defectivus (Loew, 1850)
S. elongatus Saigusa, 1973
S. fuscicaudatus Saigusa, 1973
S. kubani Ševčik, 2000
S. latus Ostroverkhova, 1979
S. lautus (Loew, 1870) i c g b
S. nepalensis Munroe, 1974
S. nobilis Lackschewitz, 1937
S. pectinatus Saigusa, 1966
S. uncatus Munroe, 1974 i c g b
S. vockerothi Munroe, 1974 i c g b
Data sources: i = ITIS, c = Catalogue of Life, g = GBIF, b = Bugguide.net

References

External links

 

Ditomyiidae
Articles created by Qbugbot
Sciaroidea genera